The Lux Style Award for Best TV Play is given by the Lux as part of its annual Lux Style Awards for Pakistani TV series. The recipient of the award is the producer of the play.

The award was first given in 2002, during the first ceremony of the award. Parizaad is the recent winner in this category.

Here is a list of the award winners and the nominees of the respective years.

Winners and nominations

2000s

2010s

2020s

Awards by networks 

 PTV – 11
 Hum TV – 8
 ARY Digital – 6
 Geo Entertainment – 3
 Urdu 1 – 1
 ATV – 1

Notes

References

Pakistani awards
Lux Style Awards